Colorado Independent School District is a public school district based in Colorado City, Texas (USA).

Located in Mitchell County, a very small portion of the district extends into Scurry County.

In 2009, the school district was rated "academically acceptable" by the Texas Education Agency.

Schools
Colorado High (Grades 9-12)
Colorado Middle (Grades 6-8)
Hutchinson Elementary (Grades 3-5)
Kelley Elementary (Grades PK-2)
Wallace Accelerated High School

Notable alumni

Jay Boy Adams (Class of 1967), singer, songwriter, guitarist

References

External links
Colorado ISD

School districts in Mitchell County, Texas
School districts in Scurry County, Texas